A localized, but devastating series of severe thunderstorms affected the Great Lakes region during May 20-21, 1953. The strongest of these storms produced three intense, long-tacked tornadoes in Iowa, Michigan, and Ontario. The worst tornado event was a violent F4 tornado that tore through the cities of Port Huron, Michigan and Sarnia, Ontario on May 21, damaging or destroying hundreds of structures and causing dozens of casualties. Overall, the tornadoes killed eight people, injured 123 others, and caused at least $17.6 million (1953 USD) in damage. Thunderstorm winds also caused an additional fatality when a tree fell on a house in Waterloo, Iowa.

Meteorological synopsis
A low pressure system formed over south central Montana early on May 20, 1953. This low moved eastward into South Dakota as favorable conditions to its east generated scattered severe thunderstorms across the Upper Midwest thanks in part to another low that was moving northeastward through Ontario. Continuing eastward, the original low moved into Minnesota by May 21 as it made a gradual northeastward turn, producing more severe weather across Ohio and Michigan until a high-pressure system pushed out of the area.

Confirmed tornadoes

According to Thomas P. Grazulis, an F2 tornado destroyed or damaged a motel and several barns as it affected six farms near Chelsea and Blairstown, Iowa before causing severe damage in Fairfax, on May 20. The tornado reportedly struck Tama and Benton counties in Iowa. However, it is not officially listed. It is also possible that this was actually the beginning stage of second Iowa F3 tornado listed below.

May 20 event

May 21 event

Port Huron, Michigan–Sarnia, Ontario

This large, violent tornado touched down at 4:21 p.m. CST near Smiths Creek, Michigan, southwest of Port Huron. It moved northeast and quickly strengthened before hitting Port Huron, resulting in widespread F3 and F4 damage. Two people were killed in Port Huron and 68 more were injured. Close to 400 homes were damaged or destroyed in the United States with monetary losses totaling $2.6 million ($24.4 million 2018 USD). Crossing the St. Clair River, the  tornado moved into Canada just south of Sarnia Harbour. Moving to the northeast, the tornado moved directly through Sarnia, Ontario, where almost 100 commercial buildings sustained damage. At least 150 homes on the more suburban outskirts of the city were damaged and in some instances reduced to rubble. Five people were killed in Sarnia. The tornado then restrengthened as it moved into rural Lambton and Middlesex Counties, where more F4 damage was inflicted upon farmsteads and homes near Nairn, before it dissipated south of Stratford. This suggested a total path length exceeding , though it is highly probable that this damage path was made up of more than one tornado, possibly as many as four. 
Seven people were killed, 117 others were injured, and damages were estimated $17.6 million (1953 USD).

Non-tornadic events
Widespread wind damage occurred throughout an 18 county area in Iowa on May 20. Some of the worst damage occurring near Almoral and Elgin where farmsteads were severely damaged. In Waterloo, a man was crushed to death when a tree fell on him while he was in bed. Other towns in the area reported mostly light damage with uprooted trees and disrupted power and communication lines and light scattered damage was reported elsewhere outside these counties as well. Wind and hail damage was also reported in Southern Wisconsin. Trees were uprooted, disrupting power and communication lines to several large cities, including Milwaukee and Madison. Rural areas were particularly hard-hit as farm buildings were damaged and small barns were destroyed. Hail caused some slight damage to crops throughout the region as well. Storm damage was also reported in Michigan the next day with winds damaged a couple of farm buildings northeast of Bath while a home and it contents along US 27 south of St. Johns were completely destroyed by fire after it was struck by lightning.

See also
List of tornadoes and tornado outbreaks
List of North American tornadoes and tornado outbreaks

Notes

References

Sources

F4 tornadoes
Sarnia
Sarnia
Tornadoes in Iowa
Tornadoes in Michigan
Tornadoes in Ontario
Sarnia